is a Japanese designer and artist.

He is active in the fields of design, architecture and contemporary art, and he is internationally acclaimed for his works dealing with light and nature.

Many of his works chosen as part of permanent collections in museums worldwide, including Museum of Modern Art (MoMA), Le Centre national d’art et de culture Georges-Pompidou (Centre Pompidou) in Paris, and Victoria and Albert Museum in London.

He has won many international design awards. In 2007 he was named by Newsweek magazine as one of the 100 Most Respected Japanese in the World.

Profile and biography 
Tokujin Yoshioka was born in Saga Prefecture, Japan in 1967. Since childhood, influenced by Leonardo da Vinci, learnt painting, such as oil painting, and had particular interest in science.

After graduating from the Kuwasawa Design School in Tokyo in 1988, he studied under the designers Shiro Kuramata and Issey Miyake.

He established Tokujin Yoshioka Inc. in 2000.

Being active in the fields of design, architecture and contemporary art, he creates works under the theme of light and nature, which also reflect the Japanese idea of beauty.

By using immaterialistic elements, such as light, creates expressions that is unique, surpassing the concept of shape.

He has designed for Issey Miyake and other global companies such as Cartier, Swarovski, Louis Vuitton, Hermès, Toyota, and Lexus, and has been announcing new works at Salone del Mobile Milano(world's largest international furniture exhibition) in collaboration with Italian furniture brands, including Kartell, Moroso, Glas Italia and Driade.

He has won many international awards, including Design Miami Designer of the Year, presented to a designer who has made the most significant contribution to design globally, Elle Deco International Design Awards Designer of the Year and Milano Design Award.

Representative works

Chairs created out of natural structure, 2001

Paper chair 'Honey-pop' (2000) is a chair that changes shape from plane to three-dimensional. By spreading open a 1 cm layer of 120 layers of thin paper, a honeycomb structure is born, and only when a person sits on it, the shape is fixed and the work is completed. 'PANE chair' (2006) is made like fiberous structure of plants, creating a structure with thin fibers of 1mm intertwining. During the production process, a block made of fibers is placed in a paper duct and put in oven as if baking a bread and by adding heat, the form of chair is shape memorized and completed. Chair made of natural crystals 'Venus – Natural crystal chair' (2008) is a work that is transformed into a chair by growing natural crystals in a water tank to create crystalline structure.

Glass projects, 2002
Has announced starting with glass bench 'Water Block' (2002), 'Transparent Japanese House '(2002), 'Chair that disappears in the rain' (2002), 'Waterfall' (2005–2006), 'Glass Tea House – KOU-AN' (2011), 'Water Block – PRISM' (2017). Glass bench 'Water Block' has been exhibited at Musée d'Orsay in Paris since 2011.

Musée d' Orsay, Paris, 2011
At Musée d' Orsay in Paris, participated in renewal project of the Impressionists Gallery. Together with works of representative Impressionists, Édouard Manet, Edgar Degas, Claude Monet, Paul Cézanne, Pierre-Auguste Renoir, 10 'Water Blocks', glass bench is permanently displayed. It blend in with light painted by the Impressionists painters, creating a space that starts a new conversation between history and contemporary.

Crystallized Project, 2008
Natural crystal chair 'VENUS – Natural crystal chair' (2008) is a work in which in a water tank, natural crystals are grown to form crystalline structures and transformed into a chair. One music piece creates one painting. With crystal paintings, 'Swan Lake', 'Destiny' and 'Moonlight', music is played during the growth process of crystals and is completed when forms of crystals are changed with the vibrations of sound. 'Rose' is a sculpture crystallizing colour pigments of rose, expressing the energy of life.

Rainbow Church, 2010, 2013
Architecture created using more than 500 crystal prisms, the 'Rainbow Church ', focuses on human sense of light perception, and is a work that is completed when a person experiences light. It is an architecture that expresses light itself, filling the space with rainbow colors as light is dispersed by prisms.

Glass Tea House – KOU-AN, 2011 

At the 54th Venezia Biennnale International Art Exhibition, Glasstress 2011, the collateral event of the 54th La Biennale di Vennezia, the glass tea house – KOU-AN was presented as an architectural project and in 2015, was built on the stage (observation deck) of Shogun-zuka, a mound of Shogun, Seiryu-den, which is a precinct of Tendai Sect Shoren-in Temple. Ao (Blue) Fudo Myo-o statue, a national treasure, one of the three great Fudo, god of fire, is dedicated to Seiryu-den. From its 220 meters altitude big stage, you can enjoy a panoramic view over Kyoto city below. In the year 794, Emperor Kanmu visited this place and appreciating its basin formation (landscape) was convinced that Kyoto is the most suitable place to be designated a capital, initiating construction of the ancient capital city. So, it is said that this is the original point where ancient capital city of Kyoto, a city that symbolizes Japanese culture began.

Tokyo 2020 Olympic and Paralympic Torch

On March 20, 2019, the torch for the 2020 Summer Olympics in Tokyo was unveiled. The torch was designed by Yoshioka to be built in the shape of an iconic Japanese cherry blossom (sakura) flower using the aluminium extrusion manufacturing technology employed to produce Shinkansen bullet trains. He also designed the Paralympic torch for the 2020 Summer Paralympics.

Representative works

 2000　Tokujin Yoshioka Design
 2000　TōFU / Yamagiwa
 2001　Honey-pop
 2001　THINK ZONE / Mori building
 2002　Water Block
 2002　Transparent Japanese House
 2002–2003　Chair that disappears in the rain
 2004　Souffle / Maison Hermès
 2005–2007　MEDIA SKIN / au design project KDDI
 2006　The Gate – Tokujin Yoshioka x Lexus
 2006　Waterfall
 2006　PANE chair
 2007　Tornado / Design Miami
 2007　Rainbow chair
 2007　Tear Drop / Yamagiwa
 2006–2008　Swarovski Ginza flagship store
 2007–2008　VENUS – Natural crystal chair
 2007–2008　Crystallized Painting – Moonlight / Destiny / Unfinished
 2008　Eternal / Swarovski Crystal Palace
 2010, 1997　Snow
 2009　Moon Fragment / Cartier
 2009　Lake of Shimmer / Basel World / Swarovski
 2010　X-RAY / KDDI iida
 2010　Stellar / Swarovski Crystal Palace
 2010, 2013　Rainbow Church
 2011　Glass Tea House – KOU-AN  / The 54th La Biennale di Venezia – Glasstress 2011
 2011　The Impressionist Gallery renewal project / Musée d'Orsay
 2013　Crystallized Painting – Swan Lake, Spider's Thread, Rose
 2013　Wings of Sparkle / Basel World / Swarovski
 2014　Cartier Time Art – Mechanic of Passion / Power Station of Art
 2015–2017　Glass Tea House – KOU-AN / Shogunzuka Seiryu-den, Kyoto
 2017　Spectrum
 2017　Water Block – PRISM
 2017　S.F chair
 2019　Tokyo 2020 Olympic and Paralympic Torch
2020　Crystal of Light / Tokyo Metro Ginza Station Public art
2022     Star / Tokyo Midtown Yaesu Public art

Major exhibitions 

 1998–2000　ISSEY MIYAKE Making Things / Fondation Cartier pour l'Art Contemporain, Ace Gallery NY, Museum of Contemporary Art Tokyo
 2002　Tokujin Yoshioka Honey-pop, MDS/G
 2005–2006　Tokujin Yoshioka x Lexus / Museum of Permanente
 2005　Stardust / Swarovski Crystal Palace / Milano Design Week
 2007　Tornado / Design Miami / Designer of the year 2007
 2007　Tokujin x Moroso / Milano Design Week
 2009　Story of … Memories of Cartier Creations / Tokyo National Museum Hyokeikan
 2008　Second Nature / 21_21 DESIGN SIGHT
 2010　Sensing Nature / Mori Art Museum
 2010　The Invisibles Snowflake / Kartell Gallery
 2011　TWILIGHT – Tokujin Yoshioka / Moroso / Milano Design Week
 2011　Tokujin Yoshioka : Waterfall / Sharman Contemporary Art Foundation
 2011　Glass Tea House – KOU-AN / The 54th La Biennale di Venezia – Glasstress 2011
 2011–2012, 2014　Cartier Time Art / Bellerive Museum, Artscience Museum, Power Station of Art
 2012　TOKUJIN YOSHIOKA 2012 CREATOR OF THE YEAR / Maison & Objet
 2013　TOKUJIN YOSHIOKA_Crystallize / Museum of Contemporary Art Tokyo
 2014　La Biennale di Venezia – The 14th International Architecture Exhibition 2014
 2015　Make Yourself Comfortable / Chatsworth House
 2015　TOKUJIN YOSHIOKA_TORNADO / Saga Prefectural Art Museum
 2015–2017　Glass Tea House – KOU-AN / Shogunzuka Seiryu-den, Kyoto
 2017　TOKUJIN YOSHIOKA_SPECTRUM / Shiseido Gallery
 2017　TOKUJIN YOSHIOKA x LG : S.F / Milano Design Week

Permanent collections 
 Museum of Modern Art, New York
 Centre Pompidou, Paris
 Musée d'Orsay, Paris
 Musée des Arts Décoratifs, Paris
 Victoria and Albert Museum, London
 Cooper Hewitt, Smithsonian Design Museum
 Vitra Design Museum
 The Art Institute of Chicago
 San Francisco Museum of Modern Art
 Saint Louis Art Museum
 Montreal Museum of Fine Arts
 Museum of Contemporary Art Tokyo
 Israel Museum
 Leeum, Samsung Museum of Art

Major awards
 1997　JCD Design Award – Grand prize (Japan)
 2000　I.D. Annual Design Review (USA)
 2001　I.D. Annual Design Review (USA)
2001　A&W Award The Coming Designer for the Future (Germany)
 2002　Mainichi Design Award 2001 (Japan)
 2005　Talents du Luxe (France)
 2007　The 57th Art Encouragement Prize for New Artist (Japan)
 2007　Good Design Award – Gold prize (Japan)
 2007　Design Miami – Designer of the Year 2007 (USA)
 2008　Wallpaper Design Awards 2008 – Best furniture designer (UK)
 2008　DFA Design for Asia Awards 2008 – Grand Award (Hong Kong)
 2009　ELLE DECO International Design Awards – Designer of the Year 2009 (Italy)
 2010　Fast Company – The 100 Most Creative People in Business 2010 (USA)
 2010　TOKYO Design & Art ENVIRONMENTAL AWARDS – Artist of the Year (Japan)
 2011　A&W Architektur & Wohnen – Designer of the Year 2011 (Germany)
 2012　Maison & Objet – Creator of the Year 2012 (France)
 2016　ELLE DECO International Design Awards (EDIDA) 2016 (Italy)
2017　Milano Design Award 2017 – Winner (Italy)

Publications, collection of works 
 2001　Tokujin Design (gap / Japan)
 2006　Tokujin Yoshioka Design (English edition, Japanese edition) (Phaidon / UK)
 2008　Second Nature (Kyuryudo / Japan)
 2009　Invisible Forms (Esquire Magazine / Japan)
 2010　SENSING NATURE (Heibonsha / Japan)
 2010　TOKUJIN YOSHIOKA (Rizzoli / USA)
 2013　TOKUJIN YOSHIOKA_Crystallize (Seigensha / Japan)
 2017　KOU-AN Glass Tea House (Kyuryudo / Japan)

References

External links

 

Japanese industrial designers
Japanese furniture designers
Japanese interior designers
Exhibition designers
Japanese installation artists
People from Saga Prefecture
1967 births
Living people